Ugly Cherries is the first full-length album by the New York City queer punk duo Pwr Bttm. According to the album's record label, Father/Daughter Records, the album is about "...the duo's experiences with queerness, gender, and adulthood over the course of a year of living in upstate New York". The album's title comes from Ben Hopkins' distaste for maraschino cherries and its personification for Hopkins' queerness, claiming "it sort of fell in line with my self loathing on the subject".

Background 
Pwr Bttm signed with Father/Daughter Records after the co-founder Jessi Frick retweeted the music video for Pwr Bttm's song "Carbs". Ben Hopkins then messaged Frick over Twitter, which eventually led to a record deal.

Recording and production 
Ugly Cherries was recorded in Hudson, New York.

Reception 

Ugly Cherries received positive reviews from music critics. At Metacritic, which assigns a weighted mean rating out of 100 to reviews from mainstream critics, the album received an average score of 79, based on 4 reviews.

Track listing

Personnel
Adapted from Bandcamp.

Liv Bruce – drums, vocals, guitar
Ben Hopkins – guitar, vocals, drums
Christopher Daly – engineer, producer
Jamal Ruhe – mastering

References

2015 debut albums
Pwr Bttm albums
Big Scary Monsters Recording Company albums
Father/Daughter Records albums
Garage rock albums by American artists